Lewis model may refer to:

William Arthur Lewis's dual-sector model in developmental economics
Richard D. Lewis's Lewis Model of Cross-Cultural Communication
Lewis acids and bases, a model proposed by Gilbert N. Lewis
John Lewis Partnership, a British  public limited company owned by a trust on behalf of its employees